Ferdinand Bader (born 21 May 1981) is a retired German ski jumper.

In the World Cup he finished once among the top 10, his best result being a fifth place from Sapporo in February 2005.

External links

1981 births
Living people
German male ski jumpers
People from Freising
Sportspeople from Upper Bavaria